Neil David Haskell (born April 16, 1987) is an American contemporary dancer and actor. He is best known as a contestant on So You Think You Can Dance where he finished third in the final four. On April 22, 2008, he began performing in the Off-Broadway musical Altar Boyz as Luke. Neil later joined The West Side Story National Tour as Snowboy, and in spring 2012 began touring in the show Bring It On: The Musical as Steven. He also returned as an All-Star in Season 7 of SYTYCD. As of fall 2019, he plays King George in the national touring company of Hamilton: An American Musical.

Early life and education 
Haskell was born in Buffalo, New York and first started dancing at age five at the David DeMarie Dance Studio in Clarence, New York and at the American Academy of Ballet in Williamsville, New York. He also had small roles in movies. At age 15, he began intensive training in ballet at the Chautauqua Institution for three summers. Haskell was raised in Clarence Center, New York and graduated from Clarence High School (Clarence, New York) in 2005. He attended Point Park University for a year, majoring in dance. Haskell has described his dance style as jazz/ballet. He earned the title of "Male Dancer of the Year" at the American Dance Awards in 2005. He got his Equity card the summer before auditioning for So You Think You Can Dance.

Career 
He has performed in the Twyla Tharp Broadway show The Times They Are A-Changin', with music by Bob Dylan, and in Pittsburgh Civic Light Opera's performances Grease, 42nd Street, Seven Brides for Seven Brothers, and Beauty and the Beast. Haskell also landed a supporting role in MTV's movie musical The American Mall, which was broadcast and DVD released in summer 2008. In Spring 2008, Haskell, along with former SYTYCD contestants Sabra Johnson and Danny Tidwell, was featured in movmnt magazine's cover story to promote 'Keep it Real', the publication's awareness nonprofit organization. In April 2008 he began playing the role of "Luke" in the Off-Broadway musical Altar Boyz. He continued playing the role of "Luke" until March 2009, and left to begin working on the new Dolly Parton musical 9 to 5. Haskell was also cast to play the leading role of Jake in the musical F#@king Up Everything in the New York Musical Theater Festival (NYMF 2009), which performs at various times from October 6 through October 17. All performances sold out. In 2010-11, he returned to So You Think You Can Dance Seasons 7 and 8 to dance as an All Star. He was also in the first national tour cast of West Side Story playing the role of Snowboy.
After touring with the musical Bring It On based on the movie of the same name, Haskell went on to originate the role of Steven on Broadway at the St. James Theatre during the fall of 2012. Haskell also has a role in The American Mall.  He plays a night janitor at the mall who is also a member of a rock band, where he played guitar and keyboards. Haskell most recently was part of the original company of the hit Broadway musical, Hamilton.

So You Think You Can Dance
Haskell was paired up with contemporary-hip hop dancer Lauren Gottlieb. The couple danced together until Week 6, when the couples were assigned new partners. Haskell was then partnered with Sara Von Gillern, and debuted their disco routine.

Haskell noted that he wants to use his experience on the show as a "springboard for the rest of [his] career".

After making it to the top 10 finalists, Haskell joined his fellow contestants in So You Think You Can Dance'''s 2007 dance tour that concluded on November 30, 2007.

On the August 7, 2008 Season 4 finale, Haskell, along with other finalists from seasons 1–3, joined Season 4's top 20 in a dance number. He also returned as an All-Star in Season 7 of SYTYCD, and again in Season 8.

 Broadway 
In the summer of 2015, Haskell joined the company of Hamilton, the musical by Lin-Manuel Miranda, for its Broadway transfer to the Richard Rodgers Theatre as a swing.

He was also a member of the cast of the new Broadway musical, Tuck Everlasting.''

Haskell rejoined Hamilton soon after, and in June 2016 he replaced Jon Rua as Charles Lee in the show's Ensemble.

Filmography

Film

Television

References

External links

 So You Think You Can Dance FOX Biography
 Neil Haskell Feature on BestofOffBroadway.com

1987 births
Living people
21st-century American dancers
American contemporary dancers
American gymnasts
American male dancers
Dancers from New York (state)
People from Buffalo, New York
People from Clarence, New York
Point Park University alumni
So You Think You Can Dance (American TV series) contestants